Too Many Husbands (released in the United Kingdom as My Two Husbands) is a 1940 American romantic comedy film about a woman who loses her husband in a boating accident and remarries, only to have her first spouse reappear—yet another variation on the 1864 poem Enoch Arden by Alfred, Lord Tennyson. The film stars Jean Arthur, Fred MacMurray and Melvyn Douglas, and is based on the 1919 play Home and Beauty by W. Somerset Maugham, which was retitled Too Many Husbands when it came to New York. The film was directed by Wesley Ruggles.

A couple of months after Too Many Husbands was released by Columbia, RKO put out a movie that was more popular both then and now, My Favorite Wife, a variation on the story with Cary Grant as the remarried spouse whose former wife Irene Dunne returns from sea. Too Many Husbands was remade as a musical, Three for the Show (1955), with Jack Lemmon and Betty Grable. My Favorite Wife came back yet again as Move Over, Darling (1963), with Doris Day and James Garner after an uncompleted 1962 version entitled Something's Got to Give starring Marilyn Monroe and Dean Martin was aborted upon Monroe's abrupt death.

Synopsis
Vicky Lowndes (Jean Arthur) loses her first husband, Bill Cardew (Fred MacMurray), when he is lost at sea, presumed drowned, and declared legally dead. The lonely widow is comforted by Bill's best friend and publishing business partner, Henry Lowndes (Melvyn Douglas). Six months later, she marries him. Six months after that, Bill shows up, after having been stranded on a uninhabited island and then rescued. Vicky has a tough choice to make.

Cast

Nomination 
John P. Livadary was nominated for an Academy Award for Best Sound Recording.

See also
 My Favorite Wife, another 1940 film, in which it is the wife (played by Irene Dunne) who returns, just as her husband (Cary Grant) embarks on his honeymoon.
 Move Over, Darling, the 1963 remake of My Favorite Wife, starring Doris Day, James Garner, and Polly Bergen.

References

External links
 
 
 
 

1940 films
1940 romantic comedy films
American romantic comedy films
American black-and-white films
Columbia Pictures films
Comedy of remarriage films
American films based on plays
Films based on works by W. Somerset Maugham
Films directed by Wesley Ruggles
Films based on adaptations
Films based on Enoch Arden
Films scored by Friedrich Hollaender
1940s English-language films
1940s American films